The Penrith Panthers were officially introduced to the New South Wales Rugby League (NSWRL - now known as NRL) - the premier Rugby League competition in Australia - in 1967 and have had an eventful 54 years, winning 4 wooden spoons and 3 premierships (finishing runners-up twice). The following are club match records:

Team

Biggest wins

Biggest losses

Longest winning streaks
17 games: 19 June - 17 October 2020
12 games: 13 March - 29 May 2021
11 games: 18 September 2021 - 29 April 2022 
8 games: 19 April - 7 June 2003

Longest losing streaks
12 games: 1 June - 24 August 1980
10 games: 23 April - 2 July 1972

Longest winning home streak

Longest winning away streak

Biggest comebacks
Recovered from a 23-point deficit
Trailed Wests Tigers 31-8 after 57 minutes to win 32-31 at Penrith Football Stadium (4 June 2000).

Recovered from a 22-point deficit
Trailed New Zealand Warriors 28-6 after 46 minutes to win 36-28 at Pepper Stadium (13 May 2017).

Recovered from a 18-point deficit
Trailed Manly-Warringah Sea Eagles 24-6 after 67 minutes to win 28-24 at Brookvale Oval (28 July 2018).

Recovered from a 8-point deficit with 2 minutes remaining
Trailed Canberra Raiders 12-20 with only 2 minutes remaining to win 24-20 at Carrington Park (10 June 2017).

Partially recovered from a 26-point deficit
Trailed New Zealand Warriors 32-6 at halftime to draw 32-32 at CUA Stadium (2009).

Worst collapse
Surrendered a 26-point lead.
 Led North Queensland Cowboys 26-0 at halftime to lose 36-28 at Penrith Football Stadium (29 May 1998) ^.

^ denotes premiership record.

Coaches
There have been 19 coaches of the Panthers since their first season in 1967.
The current coach is Ivan Cleary.

Individual

Most games for club
243, Steve Carter (1988–2001)
238, Royce Simmons (1980–1991)
238, Craig Gower (1996–2007)
228, Greg Alexander (1984–1994, 1997–1999)
211, Tony Puletua (1997–2008)
206, Brad Izzard (1982–1992)
204, Ryan Girdler (1993–2004)
199, Isaah Yeo (2014–)
186, Trent Waterhouse (2002–2011)
185, John Cartwright (1985–1996)

Most tries for club
113, Rhys Wesser (1998–2008)
101, Ryan Girdler (1993–2004)
100, Greg Alexander (1984–1994, 1997–1999)
89, Luke Lewis (2001–2012)
74, Josh Mansour (2012–2020)
73, Brad Izzard (1982–1992)
71, Michael Jennings (2007–2012)
66, Robbie Beckett (1994–2001)
65, Steve Carter (1988–2001)
65, Luke Rooney (2001–2008)

Most points for club
1,572 (101 tries, 581 goals, 6 field goals), Ryan Girdler (1993–2004)
1,211 (49 tries, 502 goals, 10 field goals), Nathan Cleary (2016–)
1,100 (100 tries, 343 goals, 14 field goals), Greg Alexander (1984–1994, 1997–1999)
798 (55 tries, 289 goals), Michael Gordon (2006–2012)
613 (43 tries, 220 goals, 1 field goal), Preston Campbell (2003–2006)
454 (113 tries, 1 goal), Rhys Wesser (1998–2008)

Most points in a season
270 by Michael Gordon in 2010
229 by Ryan Girdler in 1999 
228 by Nathan Cleary in 2017

Most tries in a season
25 by Rhys Wesser in 2003
23 by Amos Roberts in 2004 
19 by Rhys Wesser in 2006
19 by David Simmons in 2013

Most points in a match
34 by Nathan Cleary in Round 25 of the 2019 NRL season

State Of Origin Representatives

New South Wales
    Brad Izzard (1982, 1991)
    Royce Simmons (1984, 1986, 1987, 1888)
    Greg Alexander (1989, 1990, 1991)
    John Cartwright (1989, 1991, 1992)
    Mark Geyer (1989, 1991)
    Chris Mortimer (1989)
    Peter Kelly (1989)
    Brad Fittler (1990, 1991, 1992, 1993, 1994, 1995)
    Graham Mackay (1992, 1993,1994)
    Steve Carter (1992)
    Ryan Girdler (1999-01)
    Craig Gower (2001, 2004, 2005, 2006)
    Matt Adamson (2001)
    Trent Waterhouse (2004, 2009, 2010)
    Luke Rooney (2004)
    Luke Lewis (2004, 2009, 2010)
    Michael Jennings (2009–16)
    Michael Gordon (2010)
    Tim Grant (2012)
    Matt Moylan (2016)
    Josh Mansour (2016)
    James Maloney (2018, 2019)
    Nathan Cleary (2018, 2019, 2020, 2021, 2022)
    Reagan Campbell-Gillard (2018)
    Tyrone Peachey (2018)
    Isaah Yeo (2020, 2021, 2022)
    Brian Too (2021, 202)
    Jarome Luai (2021, 2022)
    Liam Martin (2021, 2022)
    Apisai Koroisau (2021, 2022)
    Stephen Crichton (2022)

New South Wales (SL)
    Craig Gower (1997)
    Ryan Girdler (1997)
    Greg Alexander (1997)

Queensland
    Darryl Brohman (1983, 1984, 1985, 1986)
    Alan McIndoe (1989, 1990)
    Matt Sing (1995)
    Craig Greenhill (1999, 2000)
    Scott Sattler (2003)
    Rhys Wesser (2004, 2005, 2006)
    Ben Ross (2004, 2005)
    Petero Civoniceva (2008, 2009, 2010)
    Kurt Capewell (2020, 2021)

Coaching
New South Wales
    Phil Gould (Coach - 1992, 1993, 1994)

All Stars Game Representatives

NRL All Stars
    Michael Jennings (2010, 2011, 2012)
    Tim Grant (2013)
    Matt Moylan (2015)
    Trent Merrin (2016)

Indigenous All Stars
    Tyrone Peachey (2015, 2016, 2017)
    Will Smith (2016)
    Jamie Soward (2016)
    Leilani Latu (2016, 2017)

Māori All Stars
  Dean Whare (2019)
  James Tamou (2019)
 James Fisher Harris (2019, 2021, 2022)
  Malakai Watene-Zelezniak (2020)
  Zane Tetevano (2020)
 Jarome Luai (2021)

International Representatives

Australia
    Royce Simmons (1986–87)
    Greg Alexander (1989–90)
    John Cartwright (1990–92)
    Mark Geyer (1990–91)
    Brad Fittler (1991–95)
    Graham Mackay (1992)
    Matt Sing (1995)
    Craig Gower (1999-01, 2003–05)
    Ryan Girdler (1999-01)
    Trent Waterhouse (2003–05, 2009) 
    Joel Clinton (2004) 
    Luke Rooney (2004–05) 
    Luke Priddis (2005) 
    Petero Civoniceva (2008–11) 
    Luke Lewis (2009–12) 
    Michael Jennings (2009) 
    Josh Mansour (2014, 2016–17) 
    Matt Moylan (2016) 
    Trent Merrin (2016–17) 
    Reagan Campbell-Gillard (2017) 
    Nathan Cleary (2022) 
    Isaah Yeo (2022) 
    Liam Martin (2022) 

 Australia (SL)
    Craig Gower (1997)
    Ryan Girdler (1997)
    Matt Adamson (1997)

Cook Islands
    Tinirau Arona (2009) 
    Geoff Daniela (2012) 
    Isaac John (2013) 
    Tupou Sopoaga (2016)

Fiji
    Livai Nalagilagi (1994) 
    Joe Dakuitoga (1995) 
    Wes Naiqama (2013–14) 
    Eto Nabuli (2014) 
    Kevin Naiqama (2014) 
    Reagan Campbell-Gillard (2014) 
    Apisai Koroisau (2015) 
    Viliame Kikau (2016–17, 2019, 2022)
    Waqa Blake (2017) 
    Tyrone Phillips (2018) 
    Sunia Turuva (2022)

Greece
    Billy Tsikrikas (2019) 
    George Tsikrikas (2019)

Italy
    Cameron Ciraldo (2013) 
    Mason Cerruto (2017) 
    Anton Iaria (2019) 
    Alexander Myles (2019) 
    John Trimboli (2019)

Malta
    Jarrod Sammut (2006–07) 
    Cowen Epere (2017)

New Zealand
    Gary Freeman (1994–95) 
    Tony Puletua (1998–00, 2002–07) 
    Joe Galuvao (2003–04) 
    Paul Whatuira (2004) 
    Frank Pritchard (2005–09) 
    Sam McKendry (2010–13) 
    Dean Whare (2013–15, 2017) 
    Isaac John (2014) 
    Lewis Brown (2014–15) 
    Dallin Watene-Zelezniak (2016–18) 
    Te Maire Martin (2016) 
    James Fisher-Harris (2016, 2018–19)

Papua New Guinea
    Paul Aiton (2007–08) 
    Keith Peters (2007–09) 
    Jason Chan (2008) 
    James Nightingale (2008) 
    Wellington Albert (2015) 
    Stanton Albert (2015)

Samoa
    Fa'ausu Afoa (1995) 
    Frank Puletua (2000, 2007–08) 
    Brian Leauma (2000) 
    Fred Petersen (2000) 
    Junior Tia-Kilifi (2006) 
    Tony Puletua (2008) 
    Joseph Paulo (2007–10) 
    Masada Iosefa (2010) 
    Mose Masoe (2013) 
    Jarome Luai (2017, 2019) 
    Christian Crichton (2018) 
    Tyrone May (2018) 
    Brian To'o (2019) 
    Moses Leota (2019) 
    Spencer Leniu (2022)
    Taylan May (2022)
    Charlie Staines (2022)
    Izack Tago (2022)

Scotland
    Lachlan Stein (2017) 
    Peter Wallace (2013)

Tonga
    Michael Jennings (2008) 
    Daniel Foster (2013–15) 
    Sika Manu (2013–15) 
    Ben Murdoch-Masila (2014–15) 
    Sione Katoa (2016–19) 
    Leilani Latu (2017) 
    Soni Luke (2022)

United States
    Mark O'Halloran (2007) 
    Junior Paulo (2011) 
    Clint Newton (2013)

References

Records
Sydney-sport-related lists
National Rugby League lists
Australian records
Rugby league records and statistics